"No Me Conoce" is a song by Puerto Rican rapper Jhayco, released as the third single from his second studio album Famouz on February 22, 2019. It was later released in a version with J Balvin and Bad Bunny, and charted on the US Billboard Hot 100. As of July 2020, the music video has received over 1.1 billion views.

Critical reception 
Matthew Ismael Ruiz of Vulture called the song a "romp that splits the difference between the classic reggaeton riddim and Latin trap's swirling atmospherics". Writing for Noisey, Gary Suarez said of the remix that it "showcases [Jhayco's] skills as both popwise hooksmith and adept spitter more than capable of contending with two of urbano's best known acts."

Charts

Weekly charts

Year-end charts

Certifications

See also 
 List of Billboard Argentina Hot 100 top-ten singles in 2019

References 

2019 singles
2019 songs
Jhayco songs
J Balvin songs
Bad Bunny songs
Songs written by J Balvin
Songs written by Bad Bunny
Spanish-language songs
Universal Music Latino singles